Ismaël Benahmed (born 20 February 1989) is a French professional footballer who plays as a forward for Championnat National 3 club .

Career
Transferring to Tanjong Pagar United of the Singapore S.League for the 2013 season, Benahmed partnered up with Moroccan Monsef Zerka up front, earning an emolument higher than what he was used to in France. However, in the end, he longed to see his family and cancelled the option of a contract extension, eventually leaving the club. Authoring a hat-trick in a 4-0 victory over Garena Young Lions, he claimed the level of play in Singapore was between the French fourth and third divisions.

Upon returning to France, the attacker had the opportunity to sign for a Romanian team, Târgu Mureș, but the deal never happened.

References

External links

French footballers
French sportspeople of Algerian descent
Algerian footballers
Association football forwards
Living people
Expatriate footballers in Singapore
French expatriate sportspeople in Singapore
French expatriate footballers
Expatriate footballers in Belgium
French expatriate sportspeople in Belgium
1989 births
Singapore Premier League players
Vendée Poiré-sur-Vie Football players
Tanjong Pagar United FC players
USM Bel Abbès players 
FCM Aubervilliers players
SAS Épinal players
Stade Plabennécois players
La Roche VF players
TVEC Les Sables-d'Olonne players
Division d'Honneur players
Championnat National players
Championnat National 3 players
Championnat National 2 players
Footballers from Brittany
Sportspeople from Morbihan